Slow refers to the speed of a moving body.

Slow, SLOW or Slowness may also refer to:

Music
 Slow (band), a 1980s Canadian band
 Slow (DJ) (born 1975), Finnish producer and DJ

Albums
 Slow (Richie Kotzen album), 2001
 Slow (Starflyer 59 album), 2016
 Slow, an album by Luna Sea
 Slow, an album by Ann Hampton Callaway, 2005
 Slowness (album), an album by cantopop singer Kay Tse

Songs
 "Slow" (Kylie Minogue song), 2003
 "Slow" (Rumer song), 2010
 "Slow" (Matoma song), 2017
 "Slow", song by The Fratellis from the album Eyes Wide, Tongue Tied (2015)
 "Slow", song by Lisa Mitchell from the EP Said One to the Other
 "Slow", song by Professional Murder Music from the album Professional Murder Music

Books
 In Praise of Slow, a 2004 book by Carl Honoré containing his analysis of the "Cult of Speed"
 Slowness (novel), a 1993 novel by Milan Kundera

Cultural movements
 Slow movement (culture), a cultural movement that emphasizes a slower pace in a variety of lifestyle and social areas
 Slow living, a lifestyle applying the Slow Movement philosophy
 Slow reading, the intentional reduction of the speed of reading
 Slow Food, an organization that promotes local food and traditional cooking

Other uses
 South London Orienteers and Wayfarers (SLOW), an orienteering club
 Slowness (seismology), a property of a seismic wave

See also
 Slow music, a form in a multi-movement musical piece
 Slow dance, a type of partner dance
 Tempo, the speed or pace of a piece of music
 Velocity, the rate of change of position of a moving body
 Speed of an object, in kinematics, the magnitude of its velocity
 Sitting Bull, a Hunkpapa Lakota leader also nicknamed "Húŋkešni," or "Slow."
 
 Slowe (disambiguation)
 Slough (disambiguation)
 Sloe or Prunus spinosa, a plant
 SLO (disambiguation)